Cassigerinella chipolensis is an extinct species of foraminifera belonging to the genus Cassigerinella, the family Cassigerinellidae and the suborder Globigerinina.

References

Foraminifera species
Globigerinina